Paula Peintner was an Italian luger who competed in the early 1980s. A natural track luger, she won two medals in the women's singles event at the FIL World Luge Natural Track Championships (Silver: 1984, Bronze: 1982).

References
Natural track World Championships results: 1979-2007

Italian female lugers
Living people
Italian lugers
Year of birth missing (living people)
Sportspeople from Südtirol